Narmada Prasad Prajapati (born 12 September 1958) is an Indian politician from INC. He is the former Speaker of the Madhya Pradesh Legislative Assembly.
He is the Member of Legislative Assembly representing Gotegaon in the Madhya Pradesh Legislative Assembly.

References

External links

Living people
1958 births
People from Narsinghpur district
Speakers of the Madhya Pradesh Legislative Assembly
Indian National Congress politicians from Madhya Pradesh